Fort McDowell may refer to:

 Fort McDowell, Angel Island, California
 Fort McDowell, Arizona, (also known as Camp McDowell), a community that started as a US Army fort established in 1865 on the upper Salt River in Maricopa County, Arizona
 Fort McDowell Yavapai Nation of the Yavapai people, near Fountain Hills, Arizona